is an annual mystery fiction guide book published by Takarajimasha. The guide book publishes a list of the top ten mystery books published in Japan in the previous year.

1988 
Kono Mystery ga Sugoi! 1988 (JICC Shuppankyoku. December, 1988)

1989 
Kono Mystery ga Sugoi! 1989 (JICC Shuppankyoku. January, 1990)

1991 
Kono Mystery ga Sugoi! 1991 (JICC Shuppankyoku. January, 1991)

1992 
Kono Mystery ga Sugoi! 1992 (JICC Shuppankyoku. January, 1992)

1993 
Kono Mystery ga Sugoi! 1993 (JICC Shuppankyoku. January, 1993)

1994 
Kono Mystery ga Sugoi! 1994 (Takarajimasha. December, 1993)

1995 
Kono Mystery ga Sugoi! 1995 (Takarajimasha. December, 1994)

1996 
Kono Mystery ga Sugoi! 1996 (Takarajimasha. December, 1995)

1997 
Kono Mystery ga Sugoi! 1997 (Takarajimasha. December, 1996)

1998 
Kono Mystery ga Sugoi! 1998 (Takarajimasha. December, 1997)

1999 
Kono Mystery ga Sugoi! 1999 (Takarajimasha. December, 1998)

2000 
Kono Mystery ga Sugoi! 2000 (Takarajimasha. December, 1999)

2001 
Kono Mystery ga Sugoi! 2001 (Takarajimasha. December, 2000)

2002 
Kono Mystery ga Sugoi! 2002 (Takarajimasha. December, 2001)

2003 
Kono Mystery ga Sugoi! 2003 (Takarajimasha. December, 2002)

2004 
Kono Mystery ga Sugoi! 2004 (Takarajimasha. December, 2003)

2005 
Kono Mystery ga Sugoi! 2005 (Takarajimasha. December, 2004)

2006 
Kono Mystery ga Sugoi! 2006 (Takarajimasha. December, 2005)

2007 
Kono Mystery ga Sugoi! 2007 (Takarajimasha. December, 2006)

2008 
Kono Mystery ga Sugoi! 2008 (Takarajimasha. December, 2007)

2009 
Kono Mystery ga Sugoi! 2009 (Takarajimasha. December, 2008)

2010 
Kono Mystery ga Sugoi! 2010 (Takarajimasha. December, 2009)

2011 
Kono Mystery ga Sugoi! 2011 (Takarajimasha. December, 2010)

2012 
Kono Mystery ga Sugoi! 2012 (Takarajimasha. December, 2011)

2013 
Kono Mystery ga Sugoi! 2013 (Takarajimasha. December, 2012)

2014 
Kono Mystery ga Sugoi! 2014 (Takarajimasha. December, 2013)

2015 
Kono Mystery ga Sugoi! 2015 (Takarajimasha. December, 2014)

2016 
Kono Mystery ga Sugoi! 2016 (Takarajimasha. December, 2015)

2017 
Kono Mystery ga Sugoi! 2017 (Takarajimasha. December, 2016)

See also 
 Honkaku Mystery Best 10
 Japanese detective fiction
 Tozai Mystery Best 100
 The Top 100 Crime Novels of All Time
 Kono Light Novel ga Sugoi!
 Kono Manga ga Sugoi!

References

External links 
 Takarajimasha
 J'Lit Books from Japan| Awards: Konomys No. 1 Ranking

Lists of novels
Mystery fiction
Top book lists